Kate Groombridge (born 8 July 1980) is an English fashion model and actress.

Born in a small village in Kent, she was advised to submit photos to modelling agencies by a family friend, and she was modelling professionally when she was 14. She posed for teen magazines until she was 19.

In 1999, she signed as an ambassador with the lingerie company Gossard for their new "Ultrabra Superboost". The bra proved popular and was advertised extensively, and even proved controversial when the advertising campaign was considered too racy for British television. This success led Gossard to extend Groombridge's contract, and she became the face of Gossard's entire product line.

She has appeared as a cover girl in several magazines, including Esquire, Maxim and FHM, and she appears regularly in FHM'''s annual "100 sexiest women" poll.

Groombridge had a small part in the 2005 Steven Seagal film Submerged, and in September 2007 she had a larger role in the romantic comedy film Virgin Territory, playing the character Elissa. She has two further films in the can, Coffee Sex You and Shifty''.

She has two sons, Gilbert and Percy.  She has largely retired from acting and modelling to focus on raising them.

Agencies
Premier Model Management (London, United Kingdom)

Acting and commercial Agent is Independent, London

References

External links
  
 
 The Internet Fashion Database

English female models
English film actresses
1980 births
Living people